

The Buethe Barracuda is an American two-seat cabin monoplane designed by William Buethe and sold as plans or kits for amateur construction.

Design and development
The prototype Barracuda first flew on 29 June 1975, it is an all-wood, low-wing monoplane with a retractable tricycle landing gear. The enclosed cabin has side-by-side configuration seating for two with dual controls. The prototype was powered by a  Lycoming IO-540-C4B5 engine but it was designed to take engines between 150 and 300 hp (112-234 kW).

Specifications (Prototype)

References

Notes

Bibliography

1970s United States civil utility aircraft
Homebuilt aircraft
Low-wing aircraft
Single-engined tractor aircraft
Barracuda
Aircraft first flown in 1975